Thimmanahalli is a village in Chikkanayakanahalli, a town in Tumkur District.  Its estimated population is about 5500-6000.  Thimmanahalli is also known as Kaayi Thimmanahalli.

History 

In 18th century, Thimmarasu Nayaka built fort at the site & established it as a province 
of the empire.  The remnants of Fort could be found adjacent to Bandi-Mane (Bandimane) near Eshwar 
Temple.  The prime crops that are grown in Thimmanahalli are coconut's Araca nut, 
paddy & ragi.  It is famous for coconuts and sometimes referred to as Kaayi Thimmanahalli.

Religion 
The residents of Thimmanahalli are primarily Hindu, Muslim, and Christian and the village is home to Temples, a Mosque and a Church.

See also
Hagalavadi
Bukkapatna

Villages in Tumkur district